Sapne Saajan Ke is a 1992 Hindi language movie directed by Lawrence D'Souza, starring Karishma Kapoor, Rahul Roy, and Jackie Shroff.

Plot
Superstar Jackie Shroff's driver Alok Nath was not able to do his job, so he was replaced by his son Deepak (Rahul Roy).

When Deepak (Rahul Roy) was with Jackie Shroff at a musical night program, Deepak first met with Jyoti (Karishma Kapoor), then Kumar Sanu (himself) and Alka Yagnik (herself) starting a musical number "Ye Dua Hai Meri Rab Se." By the song's end Deepak and Jyoti had fallen in love.

Joyti's mother Shalini (Aruna Irani) wants her to marry the son of wealthy man, Gulu (Gulshan Grover). But Jyoti isn't attracted to Gulu. Shalini agrees with her daughter's choice and lets her marry Deepak. But Jyoti learns that Deepak is not a wealthy man as he pretended to be all along.

Cast

Karisma Kapoor - Jyoti
Rahul Roy - Deepak
Jackie Shroff - Himself
Dimple Kapadia - Herself
Gulshan Grover - Gulu/Gulshan
Aruna Irani - Shalini (Jyoti's mother)
Shobha Khote - Gulu/Gulshan Mother
Dinesh Hingoo - Gulu/Gulshan Father
Reema Lagoo - Deepak's mother
Alok Nath - Deepak's father
Yunus Parvez - Astrologer, Special Appearance 
Vikas Anand - Police Inspector 
Kumar Sanu - Himself Special Appearance 
Alka Yagnik - Herself Special Appearance
Brahm chari - Movie star's secretary

Directed by	Lawrence D'Souza
Produced by	Sudhakar Bokade
Financed by     Vijaykumar G Tulsiani
Written by	Mushtaq Merchant (Dialogue)

Soundtrack 

The soundtrack became an all-time hit and was the eighth best-selling Bollywood soundtrack of 1992. The soundtrack was composed by Nadeem-Shravan. One song Ye Dua Hai Meri Rab Se is penned by Anwar Sagar, all other songs were penned by Sameer. Three musical numbers were very popular: "Ye Dua Hai Meri Rab Se" became famous. Singers Kumar Sanu and Alka Yagnik made a special appearance in the video of the song. Another hit song, "Kabhi Bhola Kabhi Yaad Kiya" was picturized like a shooting at a movie set, and Dimple Kapadia had a special appearance in this song. "Sapne Sajan Ke" is very famous nowadays at weddings.

Ye Dua Hai Meri was recreated in 2020 by Rochak Kohli in the voice of Jubin Nautiyal. The video of the song became very popular on YouTube. Nautiyal's voice was well praised by the audience.

References

External links 
 

1992 films
1990s Hindi-language films
Films scored by Nadeem–Shravan
Films directed by Lawrence D'Souza